Eoin Patrick Wearen (born 2 October 1992) is a retired Irish footballer who played as a midfielder/defender for various clubs in both the UK and Ireland.

Club career
Growing-up in Dublin, Wearen played Gaelic football for Scoil Uí Chonaill and football for St. Kevin's Boys, the boys' club in Dublin which gave starts to Liam Brady, Damien Duff and Stephen Carr amongst others.  Given the opportunity to join Dublin's Gaelic Football team in 2008 he instead chose to join the youth team of West Ham United.

Having played youth and reserve team football, in January 2012 he moved on loan to League Two side, Dagenham & Redbridge until 31 January 2012. Wearen made his debut for Dagenham on 7 January in the FA Cup third-round game against Millwall which finished 0–0. At the end of January 2012 Wearen returned to West Ham having played four games, in all competitions, for Dagenham. Wearen signed for League of Ireland side Bohemians in May 2014, making his debut as a half-time substitute against Derry City on 2 May at Dalymount Park. In November 2014, Wearan signed for Sligo Rovers. Following on from Owen Heary's departure from Sligo Rovers, Wearen rejoined Bohemians in July 2015.

In January 2018, Wearen joined Limerick.

On 28 January 2019, Wearen signed for NIFL Premiership club Glenavon on a -year contract. Following multiple leg injuries Glenavon and Wearen mutually terminate his contract in December.

Whilein the United States, Wearen began playing for the Denton Diablos of the National Premier Soccer League, a semi-professional summer league. During his first season, Wearen wore the captain's armband and the team won the NPSL National Championship, with him also scoring an early goal in the final against Tulsa Athletic.

International career
Making his debut in the qualifying rounds of the 2008 UEFA European Under-17 Football Championship Wearen has represented the Ireland under-17 team and the Ireland under-19 team.

Coaching career
Following Wearen's first anterior cruciate ligament injury whilst at West Ham, he combined studying at the Open University with gaining his coaching badges, working with Bohemians' youth sides as a coach. After his spell at Glenavon and following competition of his UEFA Licensing, Wearen took up an opportunity to further his coaching career in Dallas, Texas. 

In 2022, Wearen went to Chicago to join Liverpool's International Academy America.

Career statistics

Honours 
Bohemians
 Leinster Senior Cup (1): 2015-2016

Glenavon
 Mid-Ulster Cup (1): 2018–19

Denton Diablos
 Lone Star Conference (1): 2021
 NPSL West Region (1): 2021
 NPSL National Championship (1): 2021

References

External links

1992 births
Living people
West Ham United F.C. players
Dagenham & Redbridge F.C. players
Association football midfielders
Association footballers from Dublin (city)
Republic of Ireland association footballers
Republic of Ireland youth international footballers
English Football League players
League of Ireland players
National Premier Soccer League players
Bohemian F.C. players
Sligo Rovers F.C. players
Limerick F.C. players
Glenavon F.C. players
Irish expatriate association footballers
Irish expatriate sportspeople in the United States
Alumni of the Open University
Expatriate soccer players in the United States
Republic of Ireland expatriate football managers
Republic of Ireland football managers
Liverpool F.C. non-playing staff
Association football coaches